The 2001 State of Origin series was the 20th year that the annual three-game series between the Queensland and New South Wales representative rugby league football teams was contested entirely under 'state of origin' selection rules. The series was notable for marking the first time an England-based player was selected for State of Origin: Maroons legend Allan Langer was asked to make his comeback for the third and deciding match of the series and did so, helping Queensland re-claim the shield in Brisbane.

Game I
Queensland stalwart coach Wayne Bennett made it a personal mission to regain the great loss of credibility suffered from the 2000 series whitewash and 40 point last game defeat and decided he wanted his old Maroon coaching job back after a two-year sojourn.

In game I Queensland blooded no less than ten new players and Wayne Bennett gambled on the likes of Brisbane Broncos forward Carl Webb and North Queensland Cowboys John Buttigieg and John Doyle who were relative unknowns. But they each announced their representative arrival in dramatic style with a try each in the first game, won 34-16 by the Maroons in the last match played at the "old" Suncorp Stadium. The most spectacular was Webb's two minutes before half-time when he brushed off three defenders before powering his way across the line.

Game II
Queensland went into game 2 without captain Gorden Tallis who was out with a neck injury.

Played before 70,000 at Telstra Stadium, Blues skipper Brad Fittler scored two tries in what was to be his last match for NSW on home soil and inspired his side to a 26-8 victory. Man of the match was Trent Barrett playing halfback for the first time due to injuries to Brett Kimmorley and Andrew Johns. Debutante Mark O'Meley was particularly impressive, setting up Fittler's first try after 53 minutes with a smashing run that sent defenders skittling.

Game III
The lead up to Game III was dominated by emotion regarding Brad Fittler's pending retirement from representative football after 29 Origin appearances. But with the series tied at one game apiece Queensland needed some special emotion of their own to avoid a loss. Without inspirational captain Tallis and an established halves pairing, coach Bennett undertook furtive negotiations with Maroon's veteran Allan Langer, then in his second English season and captain of the Warrington Wolves, and the rumours were only confirmed after Langer had boarded a plane (under a false name) for the flight home, bound for his 31st career Origin appearance. At almost 35 years of age, Langer was named in his famous No.7 jersey for the first time since leaving Australia part-way through the 1999 NRL season.

Despite NSW centre Ryan Girdler scoring the fastest try in Origin history after 39 seconds, Queensland took a 28-8 lead into the break with Langer heavily involved in three of the Maroons' first half tries. Alongside Darren Lockyer who created his own form of havoc, Langer tore New South Wales to shreds and capped his comeback in the 54th minute when he scored a trademark solo try from close range to sentence the Blues to a series-deciding loss and Fittler to his own bittersweet representative farewell (although he would make a comeback three years later and help his state to a victory in his final year before retirement).

Sydney's The Daily Telegraph reacted to the New South Wales team's Origin loss with this headline on the front of its paper on July 2, 2001: "BLOODY ALF".

New South Wales squad

Queensland squad

See also
2001 NRL season

References

Sources
 Big League's 25 Years of Origin Collectors' Edition, News Magazines, Surry Hills, Sydney

State of Origin series
State of Origin series